Paul Connolly is an English footballer.

Paul Connolly may also refer to:

Paul Connolly (cricketer) (born 1990), Jersey cricketer
Paul Connolly (education professor), British academic
Paul Connolly (journalist), investigative reporter
Paul Connolly (music publisher), music publisher
Paul Connolly (politician) (born 1946), Canadian politician